Freddie Sauer (born 2 August 1961) is a former professional tennis player from South Africa.

Career
Sauer had his breakthrough year in 1982, when he was a quarter-finalist at Caracas, Cologne, Dortmund and Stowe. He defeated top seed Johan Kriek in his run to the Stowe quarter-finals. Also that year, Sauer had his only win in a Grand Slam tournament, beating John Letts in the US Open. In the second round he was beaten by Jaime Fillol in a close match, that was decided in a fifth set tiebreak.

On the doubles circuit, Sauer had his best performances partnering countryman Schalk van der Merwe. The pair were runners-up at Boston in 1982 and in the same year reached the second round at the French Open and Wimbledon Championships.

Career finals

Doubles: 1 (0–1)

Challenger titles

Doubles: (1)

References

1961 births
Living people
South African male tennis players